The Ministry of Defence (MoD) is a Bangladeshi government ministry. It is the ministry of defence of Bangladesh. The MoD is headed by the Minister of Defence, a civilian and member of cabinet; the post is usually held by the Prime Minister of Bangladesh, who also serves as the President's second-in-command of the military. The MoD exercises supreme command authority over the Bangladesh Armed Forces.

Organisational structure
Parliament is constitutionally responsible for working with the president and the service chiefs in ensuring the nation's defence. In practice, however, members of Parliament have never played a significant role in either national defence planning or defence budgeting, the Defence Secretary does.

Agencies and departments under the Ministry of Defence
The list of agencies and departments under the Ministry of Defence of Bangladesh are given below:

Defence Forces
 Bangladesh Army
 Bangladesh Navy
 Bangladesh Air Force

Inter-Forces institutions
 Directorate General of Medical Services (DGMS)
 National Defence College (NDC)
 Defence Services Command and Staff College (DSCSC)
 Military Institute of Science and Technology (MIST)
 Armed Forces Medical College (AFMC)
 Army Medical Corps(AMC) 
 Armed Forces Medical Institute (AFMI)
 Armed Forces Institute of Pathology (AFIP)
 Bangladesh Ordnance Factories (BOF)
 Inter Services Selection Board (ISSB)
 Bangladesh Armed Services Board (BASB)
 Directorate General of Defence Purchase (DGDP)
 Directorate General of Forces Intelligence (DGFI)
 Inter-Services Public Relations (ISPR)
 Governing Bodies of Cadet Colleges

Other agencies and departments
 Bangladesh National Cadet Corps (BNCC)
 Bangladesh Meteorological Department (BMD)
 Bangladesh Space Research and Remote Sensing Organization (SPARRSO)
 Survey of Bangladesh (SOB)
 Department of Military Lands & Cantonments(DML&C)
 Department of Cipher
 Controller General of Defence Finance (CGDF)
 Office of Chief Administrative Officer (CAO)
 Ministry of Defence Constabulary (MODC)

Role and working
The functions of the MoD are:
 Defence of Bangladesh.
 Defence Services of Bangladesh and Armed Forces attached to or operating with any of the Armed Forces of Bangladesh excluding planning, co-ordination and arrangement of mobilisation of the defence services on declaration of national emergency/war and co-ordination and control of the activities of the defence services when deployed in aid of civil administration.
 Army, Naval and Air Force Works
 Production of cypher documents
 Bangladesh Ordnance Factories (Produce Ammunition and Arms for Bangladesh Army)
 International Red Cross and Geneva Conventions in so far as these affect belligerents
 Gallantry awards and decorations in respect of forces under its control
 Military Lands and Cantonments
 Meteorological Observations
 Pardons, reprieves and respites, etc., of all personnel belonging to armed forces
 National Services and Bangladesh National Cadet Corps (BNCC)
 Matters relating to Cadet Colleges
 Matters relating to Space Research and Remote Sensing Organisation (SPARRSO)
 Civil Services paid from Defence Estimates
 Hydrographic Surveys and preparation of navigational charts (excluding Hydrographic surveys in the inland water of Bangladesh and preparation of charts for inland navigation)
 Survey of Bangladesh
 Budget legal and statutory matters of the Armed Forces
 Secretarial administration including financial matters
 Administration and control of subordinate offices and organisations under this ministry
 Liaison with International Organisations  and matters relating to treaties and agreements with other countries and world bodies relating to subject allotted to this ministry
 All laws on subjects allotted to this ministry
 Inquires and statistics on any of the subjects allotted to this ministry.
 Fees in respect of any of the subjects allotted to this ministry except fees taken in courts

List of defence secretaries

References

 
Defence agencies of Bangladesh
Bangladesh
Defence
Military of Bangladesh